Attorney General Elliott may refer to:

Ivan A. Elliott (1889–1990),  Attorney General of Illinois
Robert B. Elliott (1842–1884),  Attorney General of South Carolina